Dave Baker (October 8, 1955) is an American politician serving as a member of the Kansas House of Representatives from the 68th district. Elected in November 2016, he assumed office on January 9, 2017. Outside of politics, Baker has worked as a real estate agent.

References 

Living people
Republican Party members of the Kansas House of Representatives
1955 births
21st-century American politicians
American real estate brokers